Baryglossa is a genus of tephritid  or fruit flies in the family Tephritidae.

Species
 Baryglossa bequaerti
 Baryglossa emorsa
 Baryglossa histrio

References

Blepharoneurinae
Tephritidae genera